"How About You?" is a popular song composed by Burton Lane, with lyrics by Ralph Freed. (1941 in music) It was introduced in the 1941 film Babes on Broadway by Judy Garland and Mickey Rooney.

The lyrics of the song are often changed depending on the recording artist. In its original form it is a humorous romantic duet, though rarely recorded that way. Certain lyrics, especially those with topical references, are often changed based on the time of the performance's release. For example, the line "Franklin Roosevelt's looks give me a thrill" was changed to "James Durante's looks" in a 1956 recording by Sinatra, though he did sing it in its original form when he recorded it with Tommy Dorsey in  December 1941.

Bob Crosby, Mary Livingstone and Jack Benny sang the song as a novelty trio on a 1955 episode of Benny's TV show.

Lucille Ball and Van Johnson sang and danced to this song on an episode of I Love Lucy.

Other film appearances
 The song was also featured in The Fisher King with Robin Williams (when it was sung and whistled by Harry Nilsson). 
 Richard Dreyfuss hums and sings part of the song in The Goodbye Girl. 
 Mammy Two Shoes hums and sings part of the song in 1943 Tom and Jerry cartoon, The Lonesome Mouse. 
 Eve Marley sings it, dubbing for Anne Bancroft, in Don't Bother to Knock (1952). 
 The music of the song appears in the films All About Eve (1950) (it is played on the piano at the party while the guests are gathered on the stairs ) and in Bachelor in Paradise (1961).
 Denea Wilde sings this song in a key, memorable scene of the original 1971 version of the film Get Carter.

Notable recordings
1941 Judy Garland
1956 Frank Sinatra - Songs for Swingin' Lovers (1956); The Legendary Sides (1997) with Tommy Dorsey
1958 Bing Crosby and Rosemary Clooney - Fancy Meeting You Here with Billy May
1959 Shirley Bassey - Bewitching Miss Bassey
1959 Joni James - Joni Sings Sweet
1961 Bobby Darin - Love Swings
1964 Steve Lawrence - Academy Award Losers.
1988 Michael Feinstein - Isn't It Romantic
1991 Harry Nilsson - The Fisher King Soundtrack
1998 Rosemary Clooney and Barry Manilow - At Long Last with the Count Basie Orchestra
2022 Daisy Duck (Tress MacNeille) - The MousePack - Mickey and Friends Singing Classic Standards

References

1941 songs
Songs written for films
Songs with lyrics by Ralph Freed
Songs with music by Burton Lane
Judy Garland songs
Frank Sinatra songs